The Torrington Main Post Office in Torrington, Wyoming was built in 1932 as part of a facilities improvement program by the United States Post Office Department.  The post office in Torrington was nominated to the National Register of Historic Places as part of a thematic study comprising twelve Wyoming post offices built to standardized USPO plans in the early twentieth century.

References

External links

 at the National Park Service's NRHP database
Torrington Main Post Office at the Wyoming State Historic Preservation Office

Neoclassical architecture in Wyoming
Government buildings completed in 1931
Buildings and structures in Goshen County, Wyoming
Post office buildings in Wyoming
Post office buildings on the National Register of Historic Places in Wyoming
National Register of Historic Places in Goshen County, Wyoming
Torrington, Wyoming